The first use of "light blue" as a color term in English is in the year 1915.

In Russian and some other languages, there is no single word for blue, but rather different words for light blue and dark blue. The Ancient Greek word for a light blue, also could mean light green, gray, or yellow.

In Modern Hebrew, light blue,  is differentiated from blue, . In Modern Greek, light blue,  is also differentiated from blue, .

Variations

Light blue (Crayola)

Displayed at the right is the color that is called "light blue" in Crayola crayons. It was only available in 1958.

Light blue in human culture
Cartography
 In historical atlases published in Germany, light blue is traditionally used as a color to represent Germany, as opposed to pink for England, purple for France, and light green for Russia.

Heraldry and flags
 Bleu celeste (sky blue) is a non-standard tincture in heraldry and vexillology.
 The national flags of Argentina, the Bahamas, Botswana, Fiji, Guatemala, Kazakhstan, Micronesia, Palau, Somalia, and Tuvalu all have light blue as a dominant color.

Gender
 In modern Western culture, gender norms for colours are that light blue is commonly used to represent boys as opposed to the color pink, which is used to represent girls (but see the counterexamples at List of historical sources for pink and blue as gender signifiers).

Interior design
 The color light blue is commonly regarded as calming and relaxing.  Because of this, it is sometimes used to paint hospital rooms.
 Since the color light blue reminds many people of water (although the actual color of water is cyan), light blue is a popular color for painting bathrooms or for porcelain bathroom fixtures.

 
School colors
 Cambridge Blue is a shade of light blue adopted by the University of Cambridge, in contrast with the University of Oxford which has adopted a dark shade of blue (Oxford Blue).

Religion
  In Hinduism, Shiva, the Destroyer, is depicted in light blue tones and is called neela kantha, or blue-throated, for having swallowed poison in an attempt to turn the tide of a battle between the gods and demons in the gods' favor.
 In Christianity, light blue represents the sin of sloth.

Sexuality
 In Russian, pink is used to refer to lesbians, and light blue refers to gay men.

Other
  , a light blue, is the national color of Italy (from the livery color of the former reigning family, the House of Savoy).
 King Louis IX of France, better known as Saint Louis (1214–1270), became the first king of France to regularly dress in blue.  This was copied by other nobles.  Paintings of the mythical King Arthur began to show him dressed in blue.  The coat of arms of the kings of France became an azure or light blue shield, sprinkled with golden fleur-de-lis or lilies.  Blue had come from obscurity to become the royal color.
 Light blue is often reported as the color of the visible light coming off of a source when ionizing radiation is released during a nuclear chain reaction. The signature "light blue glow" of Cherenkov radiation seen in nuclear reactors is a result of the constant particles and photons being ejected out of the reactor core into the water medium around it.
 In boxing, light blue is the official tone of a World Boxing Association referee's dress shirt.

References

LGBT symbols